Adam Jonathan Kuper (born 29 December 1941) is a South African anthropologist most closely linked to the school of social anthropology. In his works, he often treats the notion of "culture" skeptically, focusing as much on how it is used as on what it means.

Background

Kuper was the son of Simon Meyer Kuper and Gertrude Hesselman. He was raised in Johannesburg and attended Parktown Boys' High School. He took his first degree at the University of the Witwatersrand in Johannesburg. His doctorate, from the University of Cambridge, was based on field research in the Kalahari desert in what is now Botswana. After graduation he returned to Africa, doing further fieldwork in Botswana and Uganda. The sociologist Leo Kuper and anthropologist Hilda Kuper were his uncle and aunt.

He married Jessica Cohen (1944-2013) of Johannesburg in 1966 and taught from 1967 to 1970 at Makerere University in Kampala. From 1970 to 1976 he taught at University College London. From 1976 to 1985 he was professor of African anthropology at Leiden University in the Netherlands. From 1985 to 2008 he was a professor at Brunel University, where he was the first head of the Department of Human Sciences, and latterly head of the Anthropology Department. In 2000 and in 2007 he was, respectively, awarded the Rivers Memorial Medal and the Huxley Memorial Medal of the Royal Anthropological Institute. Kuper was a Visiting Professor at Boston University, 2011–14, and a Centennial Professor, London School of Economics, from 2013-14 where he still holds a visiting appointment.

He has lived in Muswell Hill for over 25 years. The football writer Simon Kuper is his son.

Research

In the early 1970s Kuper did fieldwork in Jamaica, on attachment to the National Planning Agency in the Office of the Prime Minister. However his main ethnographic focus continued to be the societies of Southern Africa, on which he has published several books. In 1973 he published a history of British social anthropology, and since then he has continued to study and publish on the intellectual history of anthropology, most recently a book on the idea of culture in the anthropological tradition. He was awarded a Leverhulme Major Research Grant for two years (2003-5) which allowed him to spend more time on research. The topic was cousin marriage and incest in nineteenth century England.

He has supervised many PhD students on Southern African ethnography, history of anthropology, family business, and kinship.

Retirement dispute
In January 2009 it was revealed that Brunel had reneged on an agreement to let him stay until 2010. Instead, he was forcibly retired in late 2008, just after the census date for publications submitted to the Research Assessment Exercise had passed. Kuper responded by suing the university for breach of contract. In 2011, employment laws were changed to permit phased retirements past the age of 65. This was because of changes to the 2006 Employment (Age) Regulations making mandatory retirement imposed by the employer unlawful.

Selected publications
Wives for Cattle: Bridewealth and Marriage in Southern Africa, (Routledge, 1982)
The Invention of Primitive Society: Transformations of an Illusion, (Routledge, 1988)
The Chosen Primate: Human Nature and Cultural Diversity, (Harvard University Press, 1994)
Anthropology and Anthropologists: The Modern British School, (Routledge, 3rd edn, 1996)
The Social Science Encyclopaedia Adam Kuper, Jessica Kuper (eds.). (Taylor & Francis, 1996)
Culture: The Anthropologists' Account, (Harvard University Press, 1999)
Incest and Influence: The Private Life of Bourgeois England, (Harvard, 2009)

Further reading

References

1941 births
Living people
Anthropology educators
Anthropology writers
Social anthropologists
South African anthropologists
South African science writers
Academics of Brunel University London
Academic staff of Leiden University
Academics of University College London
People from Johannesburg
University of the Witwatersrand alumni
Alumni of King's College, Cambridge
Alumni of Parktown Boys' High School